Les Cousins may refer to:

 Les Cousins (music club), a 1960s folk and blues club in Greek Street, Soho, London
 Les Cousins (film), a 1959 film by Claude Chabrol

See also
 
 Le cousin
 L. S. Cousins